Pointe-à-Pitre International Airport or Pointe-à-Pitre Le Raizet Airport ( or Aéroport Guadeloupe Pôle Caraïbes "Caribbean Hub")  is an international airport serving Pointe-à-Pitre on the island of Grande-Terre in Guadeloupe, France.

It is the main hub for Air Caraïbes and Air Antilles Express. Air France also has two Airbus A320 based in Pointe-à-Pitre for regional flights. It is the largest of the six airports in the archipelago. In 2019, the airport handled  2,488,782 passengers; it is the second busiest airport in the Lesser Antilles after Queen Beatrix International Airport located in Aruba, and before Grantley Adams International Airport located in Barbados.

Facilities

It has one paved runway designated 12/30 which measures . Runway 12/30 is long enough to allow aircraft as large as the A380 to take off and land without difficulty. The airport was also one of the first to handle the first A380 prototype in the second week of January 2006, for two days. The same year, the airport celebrated its 40th anniversary. The airport has two interconnected terminals, Terminal 1 and Terminal 2. Terminal 1 serves both international and regional flights. Terminal 2 only serves regional flights. 

The former Air Guadeloupe had its head office at the airport.

Airlines and destinations

Statistics

Annual passenger traffic (enplaned + deplaned), 2000 - 2020

10 busiest routes from Guadeloupe Pôle Caraîbes Airport in 2020

References

External links
 Chambre de Commerce et d'Industrie de Pointe à Pitre 
 
 

Airports in Guadeloupe
Airport